An emblem book is a book collecting emblems (allegorical illustrations) with accompanying explanatory text, typically morals or poems. This category of books was popular in Europe during the 16th and 17th centuries.

Emblem books are collections of sets of three elements: an icon or image, a motto, and text explaining the connection between the image and motto. The text ranged in length from a few lines of verse to pages of prose. Emblem books descended from medieval bestiaries that explained the importance of animals, proverbs, and fables.  In fact, writers often drew inspiration from Greek and Roman sources such as Aesop's Fables and Plutarch's Lives.

Definition 

Scholars differ on the key question of whether the actual emblems in question are the visual images, the accompanying texts, or the combination of the two. This is understandable, given that first emblem book, the Emblemata of Andrea Alciato, was first issued in an unauthorized edition in which the woodcuts were chosen by the printer without any input from the author, who had circulated the texts in unillustrated manuscript form. It contained around a hundred short verses in Latin. One image it depicted was the lute, which symbolized the need for harmony instead of warfare in the city-states of Italy.

Some early emblem books were unillustrated, particularly those issued by the French printer Denis de Harsy. With time, however, the reading public came to expect emblem books to contain picture-text combinations. Each combination consisted of a woodcut or engraving accompanied by one or more short texts, intended to inspire their readers to reflect on a general moral lesson derived from the reading of both picture and text together. The picture was subject to numerous interpretations: only by reading the text could a reader be certain which meaning was intended by the author. Many of the symbolic images present in emblem books were used in other contexts, on clothes, furniture, street signs, and the façades of buildings. For instance, a sword and scales symbolized death.

Miscellany  
Emblem books, both secular and religious, attained enormous popularity throughout continental Europe, though in Britain they did not capture the imagination of readers to quite the same extent. The books were especially numerous in the Netherlands, Belgium, Germany, and France. Emblem books first became popular in the sixteenth century with Andrea Alciato's Emblemata and remained popular until the eighteenth century.

Many emblematic works borrowed plates or texts (or both) from earlier exemplars, as was the case with Geoffrey Whitney's Choice of Emblemes, a compilation which chiefly used the resources of the Plantin Press in Leyden.

Early European studies of Egyptian hieroglyphs, like that of Athanasius Kircher, assumed that the hieroglyphs were emblems, and imaginatively interpreted them accordingly.

A similar collection of emblems, but not in book form, is Lady Drury's Closet.

Timeline

Authors and artists famous for emblem books 
 Andrea Alciato (1492 – 1550)
 Guillaume de La Perrière (1499/1503 – 1565)
 Georgette de Montenay (1540 – 1581)
 Otto van Veen (c.1556 – 1629)
 Jacob Cats (1577 – 1660)
 Albert Flamen (c.1620 – after 1669)

Further reading 
 Dunn, R.(2015). Breaking a tradition: Hester Pulter and the English emblem book. The Seventeenth Century, 30:1, 55–73.
 Saunders, A. (2008). French emblematic studies. French Studies: A Quarterly Review. 62(4), 455–463. Oxford University Press.
 Stronks, E.(2009). Dutch religious love emblems: Reflections of faith and toleration in the later 17th century. Literature & Theology, 23(2), 142–164.
 Peter Maurice Daly, Leslie T. Duer, Alan R.(1995) Young, Anthony RaspaThe English Emblem Tradition: Emblematic flag devices of the English civil wars, 1642–1660.University of Toronto Press
 Peter Maurice Daly(1998). Literature in the Light of the Emblem: Structural Parallels Between the Emblem and Literature in the Sixteenth and Seventeenth Centuries .University of Toronto Press
 The English Emblem Tradition. Volumes 1-5 .University of Toronto Press
 Peter Maurice Daly, G. Richard Dimler(1997-2006). Corpus Librorum Emblematum(CLE):Primary literature - The Jesuit Series. Parts 1 - 5.University of Toronto Press

References

Arthur Henkel & Albrecht Schöne, Emblemata, Handbuch zur Sinnbildkunst des XVI. und XVII. Jahrhunderts, Verlag J.B. Metzler, Stuttgart - Weimar 1996, .  Massive catalog reproducing emblems with texts from all known 16th and 17th century emblem books.
Daniel Russell, The Emblem and Device in France, French Forum, Lexington, KY, 1985.

External links

the OpenEmblem Project - housed at the University of Illinois at Urbana-Champaign
Mnemosyne Emblem Project - a dozen digitized emblem books
Cumulative catalogue by IDC
Society for Emblem Studies
The Symbolic Literature of the Renaissance

Regional 
The English Emblem Book Project
Emblem Project Utrecht - "27 Dutch love emblem books, religious as well as profane" 
Glasgow University Emblem Website including French and Italian emblem books
Literatura Emblemática Hispánica

Non-fiction genres
European literature

Iconography